Albrecht Freiherr von Boeselager (born 4 October 1949) is a German lawyer and forester and was formerly a member of the Sovereign Council of the Sovereign Military Order of Malta. He served as Grand Hospitaller from 1989 to 2014, and from 2014 until September 3rd, 2022 as its Grand Chancellor. Boeselagar was at the centre of a leadership controversy within the Order of Malta in late 2016 and early 2017. After Boeslager was suspended as Grand Chancellor, Pope Francis intervened to restore him to office and require the resignation of the Prince and Grand Master of the Order, Matthew Festing. Pope Francis dissolved the Sovereign Council on September 3rd,  2022 and appointed H.E. Ricardo Paterno di Montecupo as Grand Chancellor.

Biography

Boeselager was born on 4 October 1949 in Altenahr, Rhineland-Palatinate, West Germany. He is descended from the Boeselager family, an old German Catholic noble family from Magdeburg. His father was Philipp von Boeselager, an officer in the Wehrmacht who took part in the 20 July plot to assassinate Adolf Hitler in 1944. His mother was Rosa Maria von Westphalen zu Fürstenberg. His uncle was Georg von Boeselager; he also has a brother called Georg who is a banker. Boeselager married Praxedis zu Guttenberg, sister of Enoch zu Guttenberg.

After graduating from the Jesuit Aloisiuskolleg in Bonn-Bad Godesberg, he studied law at the University of Bonn, the University of Geneva and the University of Freiburg. From 1968 to 1970, following in the footsteps of much of the Boeselager family, he served in the military and retired as a Lieutenant of the reserve forces of West Germany. From 1976 to 1990 he worked as a lawyer and in 1987 took over his father's agriculture and forestry operation. He is the owner of Burg Kreuzberg an der Ahr. As a local forest owner, he is in the succession of his father, the chairman of the forestry association of his hometown Ahrweiler.

Order of Malta

In 1976, Boeselager was admitted to the Sovereign Military Order of Malta as a Knight of Honour and Devotion.  He was raised to the rank of a Knight of Honour and Devotion in Obedience in 1985. From 1982 to 2015 he was Chancellor of the German Association of the Order. From 1 January 1982 to 31 March 31, 1985, he was managing director and from 14 January 1985 to 30 April 1990 honorary director of the Malteser Hilfsdienst (an ambulance service associated with the order) in the Archdiocese of Cologne.  He now holds the rank of a Bailiff Knight Grand Cross of Honour and Devotion in Obedience.

In addition to his work in the presidium of Malteser Hilfsdienst eV, he has been a member of the Order Government in Rome since 1989, first as a Grand Hospitaller and since 2014 as a Grand Chancellor (the equivalent rank of Head of Government or Prime Minister). After his election in 1989, he was re-elected by the General Chapter in 1994, 1999, 2004 and on 8 June 2009 for a five-year term. In addition Albrecht von Boeselager has been a member of the Pontifical Council for the Pastoral Care of Health Care Workers since 1990 and since 1994 a member of the Pontifical Council Cor Unum. On 31 May 2014, he was elected Grand Chancellor of the Order by the General Chapter in Rome.

Boeselager was at the center of a constitutional crisis within the Sovereign Military Order of Malta at the turn of the year between 2016 and 2017. Boeselager was dismissed from his positions and expelled from the Order of Malta by Grand Master, Matthew Festing for alleged involvement in distributing condoms (considered "instrinsically evil" in Catholic teachings) in Myanmar through the Malteser International. The impeachment was only withdrawn at the request of Pope Francis in January 2017.

On 8 December 2016, Grand Master Matthew Festing told the leaders of the National Institutions of the Sovereign Military Order of Malta that the Grand Chancellor Albrecht Freiherr von Boeselager would be leaving office. According to media reports, Festing and Cardinal Patron of the Order of Malta, Raymond Leo Burke, demanded Boeselager's resignation, which he refused, whereupon Festing declared him deposed and provisionally expelled from the Order of Malta; the main reason cited was for the distribution of condoms by Malteser in Myanmar.

Boeselager appealed against his removal to Pope Francis, who appointed a five-member commission of inquiry of the State Secretariat under Cardinal Pietro Parolin to investigate. Festing disputed the legitimacy of this intervention of the Pope in what he regarded as the internal affairs of the Order, a sovereign entity.

The UK-based liberal Catholic magazine The Tablet interpreted the dispute as evidence of a power struggle between Cardinal Raymond Burke and Pope Francis. On 25 January 2017, the Holy See Press Office announced that Grand Master Festing had submitted his resignation during an audience with Pope Francis. Boeselager had meanwhile complained to a religious court against his dismissal. At its meeting of 28 January 2017, the Sovereign Council of the Order of Malta accepted Festing's resignation and the reinstatement of Boeselager.

The leadership of the German Association of the Order of Malta praised the role of Bergoglio and Parolin in the dispute over the Order of Malta. The chancellor of the German branch, Stephan Freiherr Spies von Büllesheim, thanked the Pope for helping the German members so quickly and confidently.

The General Chapter meeting in Rome confirmed von Büllesheim as Grand Chancellor for another five years in 2019.

Sources inside the order indicated that the row was a pretext, that Cardinal Burke wanted the knights to promote his traditionalist vision of Catholicism and that when von Boeselager was sacked he had told friends that he had been labelled as a "a liberal Catholic". Von Boeselager, in an interview said, "I think it [the condoms] was a pretext." The Grand Chancellor, meanwhile, told The Tablet during an interview at the Knights' headquarters in the Via dei Condotti, Rome, "The root cause was an increasing difference of opinions between the former Grand Master and the government of the order. It was less a difference in fundamental visions about the order but more on quite concrete matters of governance".

Honours and awards

:
 Grand Decoration of Honour in Gold with Sash of the Decoration of Honour for Services to the Republic of Austria (1999)
:
 Grand Cross of the Order of Merit of the Republic of Hungary (2009)
:
 Knight Grand Cross of the Order of Merit of the Italian Republic (1989)
:
 Grand Cross of the Order of the Lithuanian Grand Duke Gediminas (1999)
:
 Honorary Companions with Breast Star of the National Order of Merit (2000)
:
 Grand Cross of the Portuguese Order of Christ (2010)
 Grand Cross of the Order of Infante Dom Henrique (1990)
:
 Grand Officer of the Order of the Star of Romania (2012)
:
 Second Class of the Order of the White Double Cross (1998)

See also

 Boeselager
 Catholic theology of sexuality

References

External links

 Grand Chancellor at Order of Malta
 Knights do battle over Order of Malta at The Catholic Herald
 Exclusive: Order of Malta projects distributed abortifacients, says leaked report at The Catholic Herald

|-

1949 births
Bailiffs Grand Cross of Honour and Devotion of the Sovereign Military Order of Malta
Barons of Germany
German nobility
Albrecht
German Roman Catholics
Grand Crosses of the Order of Merit of the Republic of Hungary (civil)
Grand Crosses of the Order of the Star of Romania
Jurists from Rhineland-Palatinate
Knights Grand Cross of the Order of Merit of the Italian Republic
Knights of Malta
Living people
People from Ahrweiler (district)
Recipients of the Grand Decoration with Sash for Services to the Republic of Austria
Recipients of the Order of Christ (Portugal)
University of Bonn alumni
University of Geneva alumni
University of Freiburg alumni